Joachim Frederick (27 January 1546 – 18 July 1608), of the House of Hohenzollern, was Prince-elector of the Margraviate of Brandenburg from 1598 until his death.

Biography
Joachim Frederick was born in Cölln to John George, Elector of Brandenburg, and Sophie of Legnica. He served as administrator of the Archbishopric of Magdeburg from 1566 to 1598, then succeeded his father as Elector of Brandenburg in 1598. Joachim Frederick was succeeded at his death by his son John Sigismund. Joachim Frederick's first marriage on 7 March 1570 was to Catherine of Brandenburg-Küstrin, daughter of John, Margrave of Brandenburg-Küstrin, and Catherine of Brunswick-Wolfenbüttel. Joachim Frederick's second marriage, on 23 October 1603, was to Eleanor of Prussia, born 21 August 1583, daughter of Albert Frederick and Marie Eleonore of Cleves. He became regent of the Duchy of Prussia in 1605.
His titles also included "duke (Dux) of Stettin, Pomerania, Cassubia, Vandalorum and Crossen", according to the terms of the Treaty of Grimnitz, although the Pomeranian titles were only nominal.

Joachim Frederick and Catherine of Brandenburg-Küstrin had these children: 
John Sigismund, Elector of Brandenburg (8 November 1572 – 23 December 1619)
Anne Catherine  (26 June 1575 – 29 March 1612), married King Christian IV of Denmark
Girl [1576]
John George, Duke of Jägerndorf (16 December 1577 – 2 March 1624) married Eva Christina of Württemberg (1590 - 1657), daughter of Frederick I, Duke of Württemberg and Sibylla of Anhalt.  Elected Bishop of Strasbourg 1592; resigned 1604.  Herrenmeister (Grand Master) of the Order of Saint John from 1616 until his death.
August Frederick (16 February 1580 – 23 April 1601)
Albert Frederick (29 April 1582 – 3 December 1600)
Joachim (13 April 1583 – 10 June 1600)
Ernest (13 April 1583 – 18 September 1613)
Barbara Sophie (16 November 1584 – 13 February 1636), married John Frederick, Duke of Württemberg
Girl [1585/6]
Christian William (28 August 1587 – 1 January 1665)

Joachim Frederick and Eleanor of Prussia had only one child: 
 Marie Eleonore (22 March 1607 – 18 February 1675), married Louis Philip, Count Palatine of Simmern-Kaiserslautern

Legacy

Joachim-Friedrich Strasse in Berlin is named after him.

Ancestry

References

1546 births
1608 deaths
People from Berlin
Prince-electors of Brandenburg
House of Hohenzollern
German Lutherans
Electoral Princes of Brandenburg
Lutheran Prince-Bishops of Brandenburg
Lutheran administrators of Havelberg Prince-Bishopric
Burials at Berlin Cathedral